Cauchy primarily refers to Augustin-Louis Cauchy (1789-1857), French mathematician.

Many mathematical concepts have been named after him. See: List of things named after Augustin-Louis Cauchy

Cauchy may also refer to:

People
 Daniel Cauchy (born 1930), French actor
 Louis François Cauchy (1760-1848), French government official and the father of the mathematician
 Cauchy Muamba (born 1987), Congolese Canadian football player

Places
 Cauchy (crater), a small lunar impact crater
 Cauchy-à-la-Tour, a commune in Hauts-de-France, France
 Estrée-Cauchy, a commune in Hauts-de-France, France
 Sauchy-Cauchy, a commune in Hauts-de-France, France

See also
Cauchi, a Maltese surname